There are 15 state forests in the U.S. state of Tennessee.

Tennessee state forests

See also
 List of U.S. National Forests

References

External links
 Tennessee Department of Agriculture: Forests

Tennessee
State forests